Bliesmengen-Bolchen is a part of the Mandelbachtal municipality within Saarpfalz-Kreis, Saarland, Germany. Its name comes from the two villages that made up the town, Bliesmengen and Bliesbolchen, that united in 1900 and had historically been closely related. In 1974 it became part of the new municipality Mandelbachtal.

Former municipalities in Saarland